Dynamy, Inc. is a "residential internship program" in the United States. It was founded in 1969 as an experiential educational organization based in Worcester, Massachusetts.

Programs
Dynamy strives to challenge, support, and empower young adults from 17-22 to find their mission in life during a gap year. The group provides programs of internship and mentoring that help participants gain confidence, leadership skills and a sense of responsibility to their fellow man. Dynamy tried to start a branch in Santa Rosa, California in 2005-2006, but it never opened.

Dynamy Internship Year
A nine-month residential commitment that includes the following elements:
 An 18-day wilderness experience conducted by Outward Bound where each person learns to adapt to a new environment, makes friends and gains self-confidence. 
 (3) 9-week unpaid internships chosen from 200 possibilities in business, government, social service, charitable organizations, etc.

 Independent living (with other interns) where each person learns the normal routines and responsibilities of adulthood in Dynamy-owned apartments.
 Service to the community is an important part of life; interns work with Dynamy staff to organize and execute projects that make a difference. 
 The Seminar option permits interns to earn 12 hours of college credit at Clark University by participating in reading, writing and weekly discussions.  
 Advisors and individual interns meet frequently for one-on-one discussions about decisions, successes, goals, experiences and problems. Weekly meetings with the entire intern group are also held.

Most participants have graduated from high school, but college freshmen and sophomores can benefit. More than 85% of the individuals who complete the Internship continue their education, with many seeking an advanced degree.

Dynamy Youth Academy
The program, founded in 1989, is limited to 60 low income students (15 incoming freshmen each year) from the Worcester public schools. The individuals selected typically have one or more of the following characteristics: 
 Immigrants, socially isolated, low income
 Non-English speaking homes or multi-lingual
 First generation college potential
 Parents did not graduate from high school

Those chosen will participate in a four-year after school leadership and enrichment course of action designed to provide support and motivation to finish high school and continue their education. Activities include most of those included in the Dynamy internship. Full scholarships to the Colleges of Worcester Consortium are available to academy graduates.  The academy was formerly the John S. Laws Institute.

Funding
Dynamy relies on financial support from private individuals, organizations, corporations and foundations. Beginning in 2006, the academy program in Worcester was partially funded by the United Way of Central Massachusetts. Alumni, parents and friends are especially important, both for monetary gifts and to share the Dynamy vision with others.

References

Education in Worcester, Massachusetts
Organizations based in Worcester, Massachusetts
Organizations established in 1969
Charities based in Massachusetts
Charities for young adults
Community-building organizations
Internship programs
1969 establishments in Massachusetts